More than 6,600 aircraft of the Beechcraft King Air line have been delivered and are operated by corporate, commercial, military and special mission operations in more than 94 countries. Almost 53% of the aircraft delivered have been from the Super King Air 200/300 series family.

King Air

Military operators

Algeria
 Algerian Air Force
Argentina
 Argentine Army Aviation - One King Air 100.
Barbados
Barbados Defence Force
Bolivia
Bolivian Air Force - One King Air 90, One King Air F90.
Bolivian Army - One King Air 90.
Botswana
Botswana Defence Force Air Wing - 1 King Air 200 as multi-engine trainer
Canada
 Canadian Forces Air Command / Royal Canadian Air Force
Eight C90A King Airs were operated by Bombardier Aerospace as civil-registered trainers on behalf of the Royal Canadian Air Force between 1992 and 2005. Since 2005 the KF Defence Programs (formerly Allied Wings) consortium has operated seven civil-registered C90B King Airs on behalf of the CAF/RCAF.
Chile
Chilean Air Force
France
French Air and Space Force 
Greece
 Hellenic Army
 Hellenic Air Force
Indonesia
Indonesian Air Force Two A100s as navigation trainers.
Israel
Israeli Air Force - Small number of former United States Army RU-21s.

Jamaica
 Jamaica Defence Force - One King Air 100, and one King Air 350 WR.
Japan
 Japan Maritime Self Defense Force - 18 King Air C90s.
 Air Transport Squadron 61 (1989-)
 202nd Naval Air Training Squadron (1973-)
Mexico
 Mexican Air Force - One King Air 90.
Morocco
 Royal Moroccan Air Force - Six King Air A100s.
Peru
 Peruvian Air Force - Three King Air C90s.
Philippines
 Philippine Navy (TC-90s leased from the Japan Maritime Self-Defense Force)
Spain
 Spanish Air and Space Force - Nine King Air C90s.
Thailand
 Royal Thai Air Force - at least one King Air E90.
United States
 United States Air Force
 United States Army
 United States Navy - 61 King Air H90s as T-44A pilot trainers.
Venezuela
 Venezuelan National Guard Air Detachment - One King Air E90.
 Venezuelan Navy - One King Air E90.

Government operators 
Argentina
 Government of Province of Tierra del Fuego and Catamarca.
Canada
 Transport Canada
 Government of the Province of Alberta
 Government of the Province of New Brunswick
 Government of the Province of Saskatchewan
Chile
 Civil Aviation Administration (DGAC).
Colombia
 Colombian National Police
 Special Administrative Unit of Civil Aeronautics
Costa Rica
 Air Surveillance Service
United States
 USDA Forest Service
 Drug Enforcement Administration
 Federal Aviation Administration
 Governments of the states of Arizona, Arkansas, Colorado, Florida, Georgia, Indiana, Michigan, Montana, New Mexico, New York, North Dakota, Ohio and Tennessee<ref>"US civil aircraft register."  FAA search using "State of" as the Owner Name search parameter."  Retrieved: June 11, 2011.</ref>
 NASA

Former civil operators
Australia
 Royal Flying Doctor Service - operated the C90.

Super King Air

Civil operators

The King Air is used by many corporate and private users, it is also popular as a light transport liaison aircraft with both government and non-government organizations. It is also used by air-taxi and air charter companies.

Australia
 Royal Flying Doctor Service - operates a fleet of 16 B200s, 10 B200Cs, one B200GT, two B300Cs and four B350Cs.

Military operators

Algeria
 Algerian Air Force
Angola
 People's Air and Air Defence Force of Angola
Argentina
 Argentine Naval Aviation
 Argentine Naval Prefecture
Australia
 Royal Australian Air Force
 RAAF Base East Sale, Victoria
 No. 32 Squadron (1997–present)
 RAAF Base Townsville, Queensland
 No. 38 Squadron (2009–2018)
Bahamas
 Royal Bahamas Defence Force
Bolivia
 Bolivian Air Force
Botswana
 Botswana Air Force
Burkina Faso
 Burkina Faso Air Force
Cambodia
 Royal Cambodian Air Force operated a single Super King Air in 2001.
Canada
 Royal Canadian Air Force
Colombia
 Colombian Air Force
 Colombian Army
Colombian Navy
Ecuador
 Ecuadorian Air Force
 Ecuadorian Army
 Ecuadorian Navy
Egypt
 Egyptian Air Force
Eritrea
 Eritrean Air Force
France
French Air and Space Force - Two modified King Air 350s on order for surveillance duties. Delivery planned in 2019.
Greece
 Hellenic Army
Guatemala
Guatemalan Air Force
Honduras
Honduran Air Force 
India
 Border Security Force
 Aviation Research Centre
Indonesia

 Indonesian Navy 
 Skuadron Udara 600 – Operated a single King Air 350i as VIP transport since 2017
Iraq
 Iraqi Air Force
Israel
 Israeli Air Force
Italy
Italian Air Force - Two modified King Air 350ERs for SIGINT duties
Japan
 Japan Ground Self-Defense Force
Malaysia
 Royal Malaysian Air Force
Malta
 Air Wing of the Armed Forces of Malta
Mexico
 Mexican Air Force
Morocco
 Royal Moroccan Air Force
 Royal Moroccan Navy - Two maritime surveillance King Air 350ER on order. Delivery due 2019.
New Zealand
 Royal New Zealand Air Force
 RNZAF Base Ohakea, Manawatu
 No. 42 Squadron (1998–present)
Niger
Niger Air Force – one King Air 350 received in 2014.
Nigeria
Nigerian Air Force
Pakistan
 Pakistan Air Force
 Pakistan Army
Paraguay
 Paraguayan Air Force – one King Air 350 purchased in 1991 as a presidential transport.
 Base Aérea Silvio Pettirossi
 Escuadrilla Presidencial (1991–1994) 
Peru
 Peruvian Navy
Saudi Arabia
 Royal Saudi Air Force
South Africa
 South African Air Force
AFB Waterkloof, Gauteng
 21 Squadron (19??–1995)
 41 Squadron (1995–present)
 AFB Ysterplaat, Western Cape
 35 Squadron (1990–1995)
Sri Lanka
 Sri Lanka Air Force
 No. 3 Squadron (1986–present)
Switzerland
 Swiss Air Force
Thailand
 Royal Thai Army
Togo
 Togolese Air Force
Turkey
 Turkish Army
United Arab Emirates
 United Arab Emirates Air Force
United Kingdom
 Royal Air Force
 RAF Cranwell, Lincolnshire, England
 No. 45 (Reserve) Squadron (2004–2018)
 RAF Waddington, Lincolnshire, England
 No. V (AC) Squadron (2009–2011)
 No. 14 Squadron (2011–present)
 Royal Navy – Fleet Air Arm
 RNAS Culdrose, Cornwall, England
 750 Naval Air Squadron (2011–present) 
United States
 United States Air Force
 United States Army
 United States Marine Corps
 United States Navy
 Rectrix Aviation
Uruguay
Uruguayan Navy
Venezuela
 Venezuelan Air Force
 Venezuelan Army
Yemen
 Yemeni Air Force

Government operators
Australia
 Ambulance Victoria - four B200s provided by Pel-Air Aviation.
 Victoria Police - one 350ER in service provided by Skytraders.
France
 Sécurité Civile - three B200 used for liaisons duties and C2.
Malaysia
 Royal Malaysian Police - 5 in service
United Kingdom
 Maritime and Coastguard Agency - two B200s equipped with radar and electro-optical sensors for the maritime surveillance duties, provided by 2Excel Aviation.

Former operators

 Chilean Air Force An example passed on to Chile's Directorate for Civil Aviation in 2010.

 Guyana Defence Force

 Royal Hong Kong Auxiliary Air Force - two B200Cs

 Irish Air Corps

 Swedish Air Force

 References 

Bibliography

 Hoyle, Craig. "World Air Forces Directory". Flight International, Vol. 180, No. 5321, December 13–19, 2011, pp. 26–52.
 Hoyle, Craig. "World Air Forces Directory". Flight International,'' Vol. 188, No. 5517, December 8–14, 2015. pp. 26–53.

King Air
Beechcraft aircraft